State Road 423 (SR 423), known for most of its length as John Young Parkway, and Lee Road east of Orange Blossom Trail, is a four- and six-lane surface road in the U.S. state of Florida.  SR 423 runs from SR 408 north to U.S. Routes 17/92 (US 17/92) just east of Interstate 4 (I-4).

SR 423 and its southern components serve as an alternate to the parallel Orange Blossom Trail.  The road is named after John Young, a NASA astronaut and one of twelve men to walk on the Moon, who was from the Orlando area.

Route description
SR 423 is signed north-south when named John Young Parkway, while Lee Road it is signed east-west.

SR 423 begins at an interchange with SR 408 and heads north towards Orange Blossom Trail.  It then changes names to Lee Road east of Orange Blossom Trail, becoming an east-west road to its terminus at U.S. Route 17/92 just east of Interstate 4.

South of State Road 423's southern terminus, John Young Parkway, known as County Road 423 continues south towards I-4, the Beachline Expressway and the Southern Connector.  South of the Osceola-Orange county line, it is unsigned County Road 531A and continues to a single-point urban interchange with the Osceola Parkway, ending a bit north of Pleasant Hill Road near Kissimmee, where the name changes to Orange Blossom Trail heading towards Campbell and to the Osceola-Polk county line.  The section from US 192 southward is also numbered US 17-92.

History
The first section of SR 423 was built by the Florida Department of Transportation in the early 1970s, from Colonial Drive (SR 50) west of downtown Orlando north to Orange Blossom Trail (US 441-SR 500).  Over the years, extensions to the south have been built, some by Orange County and some by the state.

Future
An additional extension—which included widening the existing roadway from four to six lanes from Shader Road to the U.S. 441/Orange Blossom Trail intersection, constructing two new overpasses and completing a new 1-mile alignment extension to Forest City Road/S.R. 434 at the intersection with Edgewater Drive/S.R. 424—was completed in 2013. Benefits of the extension include a direct connection between John Young Parkway and SR 434 and a much-improved alternate route to serve commuters during I-4 Ultimate construction.

Future improvements include widening John Young Parkway from SR 50 to Shader Road from four lanes to six lanes. This capacity improvement project will also improve the level of service and enhance safety. Design is expected to be complete in Spring 2015. Construction is currently not funded; the duration is anticipated to be 24 to 30 months.

Major intersections

References

External links

423
423
423
423
1970s establishments in Florida
John Young (astronaut)